Elijah Mitchell (born 23 February 2003) is a Bahamian footballer.

Career statistics

International

References

External links
 Birmingham–Southern Panthers bio

2003 births
Living people
Association football defenders
Bahamian footballers
Bahamas international footballers
Bahamas youth international footballers
Birmingham–Southern Panthers men's soccer players
Sportspeople from Nassau, Bahamas